There are at least 314 named cemeteries in Idaho.

Idaho  is a state in the Rocky Mountain area of the United States.   Idaho is the 14th most expansive, the 39th most populous, and the 7th least densely populated of the 50 United States.

 Malad City Cemetery, Oneida County, Idaho, el.  
 Malta Cemetery, Cassia County, Idaho, el.  
 Manard Cemetery, Camas County, Idaho, el.  
 Mann Creek Cemetery, Washington County, Idaho, el.  
 Marion Cemetery, Cassia County, Idaho, el.  
 Marsh Cemetery, Clearwater County, Idaho, el.  
 Marsh Center Cemetery, Bannock County, Idaho, el.  
 Marsh Valley Cemetery, Bannock County, Idaho, el.  
 Marsing-Homedale Cemetery, Owyhee County, Idaho, el.  
 McRea Cemetery, Lemhi County, Idaho, el.  
 Meadow Creek Cemetery, Idaho County, Idaho, el.  
 Meadows Valley Cemetery, Adams County, Idaho, el.  
 Medimont Cemetery, Kootenai County, Idaho, el.  
 Melrose Cemetery, Nez Perce County, Idaho, el.  
 Memorial Gardens Cemetery, Latah County, Idaho, el.  
 Mendenhall Cemetery, Latah County, Idaho, el.  
 Meridian Cemetery, Ada County, Idaho, el.  
 Midvale Cemetery, Washington County, Idaho, el.  
 Miller Cemetery, Idaho County, Idaho, el.  
 Miller Creek Cemetery, Owyhee County, Idaho, el.  
 Milo Cemetery, Bonneville County, Idaho, el.  
 Miner Grave, Boise County, Idaho, el.  
 Miners Union Cemetery, Shoshone County, Idaho, el.  
 Moravia Cemetery, Boundary County, Idaho, el.  
 Moreland Cemetery, Bingham County, Idaho, el.  
 Morris Hill Cemetery, Ada County, Idaho, el.  
 Morrow Cemetery, Lewis County, Idaho, el.  
 Mount Calvary Cemetery, Canyon County, Idaho, el.  
 Mount McCaleb Cemetery, Custer County, Idaho, el.  
 Mount Zion Cemetery, Idaho County, Idaho, el.  
 Mountain View Cemetery, Elmore County, Idaho, el.  
 Mountain View Cemetery, Camas County, Idaho, el.  
 Mountain View Cemetery, Kootenai County, Idaho, el.  
 Mountain View Cemetery, Ada County, Idaho, el.  
 Mountain View Cemetery, Bannock County, Idaho, el.  
 Mountain View Cemetery, Benewah County, Idaho, el.  
 Murray Cemetery, Shoshone County, Idaho, el.  
 Neeley Cemetery, Power County, Idaho, el.  
 New Kilgore Cemetery, Clark County, Idaho, el.  
 New Sweden Cemetery, Bonneville County, Idaho, el.  
 Nicodemus Cemetery, Idaho County, Idaho, el.  
 Nikesa Cemetery, Idaho County, Idaho, el.  
 North Riggins Cemetery, Idaho County, Idaho, el.  
 Nounan Cemetery, Bear Lake County, Idaho, el.  
 O X Cemetery, Owyhee County, Idaho, el.  
 Old Good Hope Cemetery, Nez Perce County, Idaho, el.  
 Old Mission Cemetery, Kootenai County, Idaho, el.  
 Olson Cemetery, Cassia County, Idaho, el.  
 Overacker Cemetery, Latah County, Idaho, el.  
 Ovid Cemetery, Bear Lake County, Idaho, el.  
 Oxford Cemetery, Franklin County, Idaho, el.  
 Pack River Cemetery, Bonner County, Idaho, el.  
 Paradise Valley Cemetery, Boundary County, Idaho, el.  
 Parkview Cemetery, Payette County, Idaho, el.  
 Parma Cemetery, Canyon County, Idaho, el.  
 Paul Cemetery, Minidoka County, Idaho, el.  
 Peck Cemetery, Nez Perce County, Idaho, el.  
 Pella Ward Cemetery, Cassia County, Idaho, el.  
 Pine Crest Cemetery, Latah County, Idaho, el.  
 Pine Grove Cemetery, Idaho County, Idaho, el.  
 Pine Grove Cemetery, Kootenai County, Idaho, el.  
 Pine Grove Cemetery, Bonner County, Idaho, el.  
 Pinecrest Cemetery, Bonner County, Idaho, el.  
 Pioneer Cemetery, Gooding County, Idaho, el.  
 Pioneer Cemetery, Owyhee County, Idaho, el.  
 Pioneer Cemetery, Ada County, Idaho, el.  
 Pioneer Cemetery, Boise County, Idaho, el.  
 Pioneer Cemetery, Valley County, Idaho, el.  
 Pioneer Cemetery, Gooding County, Idaho, el.  
 Plano Cemetery, Madison County, Idaho, el.  
 Pleasant Hill Cemetery, Cassia County, Idaho, el.  
 Pleasant Ridge Cemetery, Canyon County, Idaho, el.  
 Pleasant Valley Cemetery, Owyhee County, Idaho, el.  
 Pleasant View Cemetery, Cassia County, Idaho, el.  
 Preston Cemetery, Franklin County, Idaho, el.  
 Raymond Cemetery, Bear Lake County, Idaho, el.  
 Red Elk Cemetery, Nez Perce County, Idaho, el.  
 Restlawn Memorial Park, Kootenai County, Idaho, el.  
 Rexburg Cemetery, Madison County, Idaho, el.  
 Rimrock Cemetery, Kootenai County, Idaho, el.  
 Ririe Cemetery, Bonneville County, Idaho, el.  
 Riverside Cemetery, Payette County, Idaho, el.  
 Riverside Cemetery, Clearwater County, Idaho, el.  
 Riverview Cemetery, Bingham County, Idaho, el.  
 Riverview Cemetery, Fremont County, Idaho, el.  
 Robin Cemetery, Bannock County, Idaho, el.  
 Rock Creek Cemeteries, Twin Falls County, Idaho, el.  
 Rock Creek Cemetery, Latah County, Idaho, el.  
 Rose Hill Cemetery, Bonneville County, Idaho, el.  
 Rose Lake Cemetery, Kootenai County, Idaho, el.  
 Ross Fork Cemetery, Bingham County, Idaho, el.  
 Roswell Cemetery, Canyon County, Idaho, el.  
 Rupert Cemetery, Minidoka County, Idaho, el.  
 Russell Cemetery, Lewis County, Idaho, el.  
 Ruther Cemetery (historical), Minidoka County, Idaho,  location unknown 
 Saint Anthony Cemetery, Idaho County, Idaho, el.  
 Saint Johns Lutheran Cemetery, Latah County, Idaho, el.  
 Saint Maurus Cemetery, Idaho County, Idaho, el.  
 Saint Michaels Cemetery, Kootenai County, Idaho, el.  
 Saint Thomas Cemetery, Kootenai County, Idaho, el.  
 Sanders Cemetery, Benewah County, Idaho, el.  
 Sawtooth Cemetery, Blaine County, Idaho, el.  
 Seneacquoteen Cemetery, Bonner County, Idaho, el.  
 Shoecraft and Gorman Grave Site, Clearwater County, Idaho, el.  
 Shoshone Memorial Gardens, Shoshone County, Idaho, el.  
 Skinner Cemetery, Bear Lake County, Idaho, el.  
 Spencer Cemetery, Latah County, Idaho, el.  
 Spink Cemetery, Valley County, Idaho, el.  
 Squirrel Cemetery, Fremont County, Idaho, el.  
 Standrod Cemetery, Cassia County, Idaho,  location unknown 
 Stanley Cemetery, Custer County, Idaho, el.  
 Stites Cemetery, Idaho County, Idaho, el.  
 Stone Cemetery, Owyhee County, Idaho, el.  
 Sugar City Cemetery, Madison County, Idaho, el.  
 Sunny Cedar Rest Cemetery, Cassia County, Idaho, el.  
 Sunnyside Cemetery, Nez Perce County, Idaho, el.  
 Sunset Memorial Gardens Cemetery, Latah County, Idaho, el.  
 Sunset Memorial Park Cemetery, Twin Falls County, Idaho, el.  
 Sutton Cemetery, Madison County, Idaho, el.  
 Swan Valley Cemetery, Bonneville County, Idaho, el.  
 Sweet Cemetery, Gem County, Idaho, el.  
 Sweetwater Cemetery, Nez Perce County, Idaho, el.  
 Tahoe Cemetery, Idaho County, Idaho, el.  
 Tammany Cemetery, Nez Perce County, Idaho, el.  
 Targhee Cemetery, Fremont County, Idaho, el.  
 Taylor Cemetery, Bonneville County, Idaho, el.  
 Teh LaPa Low Cemetery, Lewis County, Idaho, el.  
 Terrace Lawn Cemetery, Ada County, Idaho, el.  
 Teton Cemetery, Madison County, Idaho, el.  
 Thatcher Cemetery, Caribou County, Idaho, el.  
 Thomas Riverside Cemetery, Bingham County, Idaho, el.  
 Three Pines Cemetery, Clearwater County, Idaho,  location unknown 
 Timmerman Cemetery, Blaine County, Idaho, el.  
 Treasureton Cemetery, Franklin County, Idaho, el.  
 Twin Falls Cemetery, Twin Falls County, Idaho, el.  
 United Cemetery, Shoshone County, Idaho, el.  
 Victor Cemetery, Teton County, Idaho, el.  
 View Cemetery, Cassia County, Idaho, el.  
 Washoe Cemetery, Payette County, Idaho, el.  
 Weippe Cemetery, Clearwater County, Idaho, el.  
 Wells Cemetery, Clearwater County, Idaho, el.  
 Weseman Cemetery, Clearwater County, Idaho, el.  
 Westmond Cemetery, Bonner County, Idaho, el.  
 White Bird Cemetery, Idaho County, Idaho, el.  
 Whitney Cemetery, Franklin County, Idaho, el.  
 Wild Rose Cemetery, Latah County, Idaho, el.  
 Wilder Cemetery, Canyon County, Idaho, el.  
 Wilson Cemetery, Owyhee County, Idaho, el.  
 Winkler Cemetery, Adams County, Idaho, el.  
 Winona Cemetery, Idaho County, Idaho, el.  
 Woodfell Cemetery, Latah County, Idaho, el.  
 Woodland Cemetery, Bannock County, Idaho, el.  
 Woodlawn Cemetery, Benewah County, Idaho, el.  
 Woodville Cemetery, Bonneville County, Idaho, el.  
 Worley Cemetery, Kootenai County, Idaho, el.  
 Zion Cemetery, Latah County, Idaho, el.

Notes

Cemeteries in Idaho
Idaho (M-Z)